In computer science, software transactional memory (STM) is a concurrency control mechanism analogous to database transactions for controlling access to shared memory in concurrent computing. It is an alternative to lock-based synchronization. STM is a strategy implemented in software, rather than as a hardware component. A transaction in this context occurs when a piece of code executes a series of reads and writes to shared memory. These reads and writes logically occur at a single instant in time; intermediate states are not visible to other (successful) transactions. The idea of providing hardware support for transactions originated in a 1986 paper by Tom Knight.  The idea was popularized by Maurice Herlihy and J. Eliot B. Moss. In 1995 Nir Shavit and Dan Touitou extended this idea to software-only transactional memory (STM). Since 2005, STM has been the focus of intense research and support for practical implementations is growing.

Performance 
Unlike the locking techniques used in most modern multithreaded applications, STM is often very optimistic: a thread completes modifications to shared memory without regard for what other threads might be doing, recording every read and write that it is performing in a log. Instead of placing the onus on the writer to make sure it does not adversely affect other operations in progress, it is placed on the reader, who after completing an entire transaction verifies that other threads have not concurrently made changes to memory that it accessed in the past. This final operation, in which the changes of a transaction are validated and, if validation is successful, made permanent, is called a commit. A transaction may also abort at any time, causing all of its prior changes to be rolled back or undone. If a transaction cannot be committed due to conflicting changes, it is typically aborted and re-executed from the beginning until it succeeds.

The benefit of this optimistic approach is increased concurrency: no thread needs to wait for access to a resource, and different threads can safely and simultaneously modify disjoint parts of a data structure that would normally be protected under the same lock.

However, in practice, STM systems also suffer a performance hit compared to fine-grained lock-based systems on small numbers of processors (1 to 4 depending on the application). This is due primarily to the overhead associated with maintaining the log and the time spent committing transactions. Even in this case performance is typically no worse than twice as slow. Advocates of STM believe this penalty is justified by the conceptual benefits of STM.

Theoretically, the worst case space and time complexity of n concurrent transactions is O(n). Actual needs depend on implementation details (one can make transactions fail early enough to avoid overhead), but there will also be cases, albeit rare, where lock-based algorithms have better time complexity than software transactional memory.

Conceptual advantages and disadvantages 
In addition to their performance benefits, STM greatly simplifies conceptual understanding of multithreaded programs and helps make programs more maintainable by working in harmony with existing high-level abstractions such as objects and modules. Lock-based programming has a number of well-known problems that frequently arise in practice:

 Locking requires thinking about overlapping operations and partial operations in distantly separated and seemingly unrelated sections of code, a task which is very difficult and error-prone.
 Locking requires programmers to adopt a locking policy to prevent deadlock, livelock, and other failures to make progress. Such policies are often informally enforced and fallible, and when these issues arise they are insidiously difficult to reproduce and debug.
 Locking can lead to priority inversion, a phenomenon where a high-priority thread is forced to wait for a low-priority thread holding exclusive access to a resource that it needs.

In contrast, the concept of a memory transaction is much simpler, because each transaction can be viewed in isolation as a single-threaded computation. Deadlock and livelock are either prevented entirely or handled by an external transaction manager; the programmer need hardly worry about it. Priority inversion can still be an issue, but high-priority transactions can abort conflicting lower priority transactions that have not already committed.

On the other hand, the need to abort failed transactions also places limitations on the behavior of transactions: they cannot perform any operation that cannot be undone, including most I/O. Such limitations are typically overcome in practice by creating buffers that queue up the irreversible operations and perform them at a later time outside of any transaction. In Haskell, this limitation is enforced at compile time by the type system.

Composable operations 
In 2005, Tim Harris, Simon Marlow, Simon Peyton Jones, and Maurice Herlihy described an STM system built on Concurrent Haskell that enables arbitrary atomic operations to be composed into larger atomic operations, a useful concept impossible with lock-based programming. To quote the authors:

Perhaps the most fundamental objection [...] is that lock-based programs do not compose: correct fragments may fail when combined. For example, consider a hash table with thread-safe insert and delete operations. Now suppose that we want to delete one item A from table t1, and insert it into table t2; but the intermediate state (in which neither table contains the item) must not be visible to other threads. Unless the implementor of the hash table anticipates this need, there is simply no way to satisfy this requirement. [...] In short, operations that are individually correct (insert, delete) cannot be composed into larger correct operations.
—Tim Harris et al., "Composable Memory Transactions", Section 2: Background, pg.2

With STM, this problem is simple to solve: simply wrapping two operations in a transaction makes the combined operation atomic. The only sticking point is that it is unclear to the caller, who is unaware of the implementation details of the component methods, when it should attempt to re-execute the transaction if it fails. In response, the authors proposed a retry command which uses the transaction log generated by the failed transaction to determine which memory cells it read, and automatically retries the transaction when one of these cells is modified, based on the logic that the transaction will not behave differently until at least one such value is changed.

The authors also proposed a mechanism for composition of alternatives, the orElse function. It runs one transaction and, if that transaction does a retry, runs a second one. If both retry, it tries them both again as soon as a relevant change is made. This facility, comparable to features such as the POSIX networking select() call, allows the caller to wait on any one of a number of events simultaneously. It also simplifies programming interfaces, for example by providing a simple mechanism to convert between blocking and nonblocking operations.

This scheme has been implemented in the Glasgow Haskell Compiler.

Proposed language support 
The conceptual simplicity of STMs enables them to be exposed to the programmer using relatively simple language syntax. Tim Harris and Keir Fraser's "Language Support for Lightweight Transactions" proposed the idea of using the classical conditional critical region (CCR) to represent transactions. In its simplest form, this is just an "atomic block", a block of code which logically occurs at a single instant:

 // Insert a node into a doubly linked list atomically
  atomic {
      newNode->prev = node;
      newNode->next = node->next;
      node->next->prev = newNode;
      node->next = newNode;
  }

When the end of the block is reached, the transaction is committed if possible, or else aborted and retried. (This is simply a conceptual example, not correct code. For example, it behaves incorrectly if node is deleted from the list during the transaction.)

CCRs also permit a guard condition, which enables a transaction to wait until it has work to do:

  atomic (queueSize > 0) {
      remove item from queue and use it
  }

If the condition is not satisfied, the transaction manager will wait until another transaction has made a commit that affects the condition before retrying. This loose coupling between producers and consumers enhances modularity compared to explicit signaling between threads. "Composable Memory Transactions" took this a step farther with its retry command (discussed above), which can, at any time, abort the transaction and wait until some value previously read by the transaction is modified before retrying. For example:

  atomic {
      if (queueSize > 0) {
          remove item from queue and use it
      } else {
          retry
      }
  }

This ability to retry dynamically late in the transaction simplifies the programming model and opens up new possibilities.

One issue is how exceptions behave when they propagate outside of transactions. In "Composable Memory Transactions", the authors decided that this should abort the transaction, since exceptions normally indicate unexpected errors in Concurrent Haskell, but that the exception could retain information allocated by and read during the transaction for diagnostic purposes. They stress that other design decisions may be reasonable in other settings.

Transactional locking 
STM can be implemented as a lock-free algorithm or it can use locking. There are two types of locking schemes: In encounter-time locking (Ennals, Saha, and Harris), memory writes are done by first temporarily acquiring a lock for a given location, writing the value directly, and logging it in the undo log. Commit-time locking locks memory locations only during the commit phase.

A commit-time scheme named "Transactional Locking II" implemented by Dice, Shalev, and Shavit uses a global version clock. Every transaction starts by reading the current value of the clock and storing it as the read-version. Then, on every read or write, the version of the particular memory location is compared to the read-version; and, if it is greater, the transaction is aborted. This guarantees that the code is executed on a consistent snapshot of memory. During commit, all write locations are locked, and version numbers of all read and write locations are re-checked. Finally, the global version clock is incremented, new write values from the log are written back to memory and stamped with the new clock version.

An increasingly utilized method to manage transactional conflicts in Transactional memory, and especially in STM, is Commitment ordering (also called Commit ordering; CO). It is utilized for achieving serializability optimistically (i.e., without blocking upon conflict, and only locking for commit) by "commit order" (e.g., Ramadan et al. 2009, and Zhang et al. 2006). Serializability is the basis for the correctness of (concurrent transactions and) transactional memory. Tens of STM articles on "commit order" have already been published, and the technique is encumbered by a number of patents.

With CO the desired serializability property is achieved by committing transactions only in chronological order that is compatible with the precedence order (as determined by chronological orders of operations in conflicts) of the respective transactions. To enforce CO some implementation of the Generic local CO algorithm needs to be utilized. The patent abstract quoted above describes a general implementation of the algorithm with a pre-determined commit order (this falls into the category of "CO generic algorithm with real-time constraints").

Implementation issues 
One problem with implementing software transactional memory with optimistic reading is that it is possible for an incomplete transaction to read inconsistent state (that is, to read a mixture of old and new values written by another transaction). Such a transaction is doomed to abort if it ever tries to commit, so this does not violate the consistency condition enforced by the transactional system, but it is possible for this "temporary" inconsistent state to cause a transaction to trigger a fatal exceptional condition such as a segmentation fault or even enter an endless loop, as in the following contrived example from Figure 4 of "Language Support for Lightweight Transactions":

Provided x=y initially, neither transaction above alters this invariant, but it is possible that transaction A will read x after transaction B updates it but read y before transaction B updates it, causing it to enter an infinite loop. The usual strategy for dealing with this is to intercept any fatal exceptions and abort any transaction that is not valid.

One way to deal with these issues is to detect transactions that execute illegal operations or fail to terminate and abort them cleanly; another approach is the transactional locking scheme.

References

Concurrency control
Programming language topics
Programming language implementation
Transaction processing
Transactional memory

de:Transaktionaler Speicher